Shahadat Hossain Chowdhury (afwc, psc, te) (born 1959) is a retired Brigadier general of Bangladesh Army who also served as one of the Election Commissioners of Bangladesh during 2017-2022.

Early life
Chowdhury was born in 1959 in Companiganj Upazila of Noakhali district of the then East Pakistan (now Bangladesh) to Ali Imam Chowdhury and Ferdous Ara Begum. He is the second among his five siblings. He completed his Secondary School Certificate from Basurhat A. H. C. Government High School in 1974 and Higher Secondary School Certificate from Chittagong College in 1976. He earned his graduation in Mathematics from Chittagong University.

References

1959 births
Living people
Election Commissioners of Bangladesh
Bangladesh Army brigadiers
University of Chittagong alumni
Chittagong College alumni
People from Companiganj Upazila, Noakhali